"He's a Pretender" is a 1983 song written by Gary Goetzman (BMI) and Mike Piccirillo (BMI). It was originally recorded by R&B female group High Inergy. This was the lead single of their last album Groove Patrol, before disbanding in 1984, and it peaked at #82 in the Billboard Hot 100, #62 on the Black Singles charts. On the US, Dance/Disco Top 80 chart, "He's a Pretender" went to #25.

La Toya Jackson version

La Toya Jackson covered the song on her fourth album Imagination, and it was released as its lead single. The song peaked at #76 on the Billboard Hot Black Singles chart.

The single was released on 7" format with the album track "How Do I Tell Them" on the B-side.

Versions

References

La Toya Jackson songs
1983 songs
Songs written by Mike Piccirillo